María Victoria Zangaro Grosso (born July 31, 1969) is an Uruguayan model, television personality and television host.

Career 
She was crowned Miss Uruguay 1987 and represented her country at the Miss Universe 1987 pageant. 

She has worked in Chile, New York and Paris, with the help of the Elite agency. She hosted until 2015 on the VTV channel the program "Día a Día", a daily magazine show with Marcelo Galli.  Since July 2015 she hosts Desayunos Informales on Teledoce, a daily morning television show.

Personal life 
Between 1996 and 2011, she was married to Daniel Javier. On Sunday, April 22, 2012, she married Martín Sarthou, a journalist with a career in international politics.

References 

Living people
1970 births

External links 

 
 

Miss Universe 1987 contestants
Uruguayan female models
Uruguayan television people
Uruguayan television presenters
Uruguayan women television presenters